Michael Buchheim (born 12 October 1949) is a German former sport shooter who competed in the 1972 Summer Olympics winning a bronze medal.

References

1949 births
Living people
People from Schmölln
German male sport shooters
Skeet shooters
Olympic shooters of East Germany
Shooters at the 1972 Summer Olympics
Olympic bronze medalists for East Germany
Olympic medalists in shooting
Sportspeople from Thuringia
Medalists at the 1972 Summer Olympics
20th-century German people